Mayu Tsuruta (鶴田 真由, born April 25, 1970 in Kamakura, Kanagawa, Japan) is an actress. In 1996 she was nominated by the Award of the Japanese Academy for Best Supporting Actress in the film Kike wadatsumi no koe Last Friends. Following the chaos of Kenya's 2007 presidential election, on March 30, 2008, she visited thousands of internal refugees at Kenya's Nakuru ASK grounds, as a goodwill ambassador for Tokyo International Conference on African Development. While surveying the situation at the refugee camp, she spent time with several families and helped distribute food aid.

Filmography

Film
 Graduation Journey: I Came from Japan (1993)
 きけ、わだつみの声 Last Friends (Kike wadatsumi no koe Last Friends, 1995)
 Sōrito Yobanaide (1997)
 Owls' Castle (1999)
 Mr. Rookie (2002)
 Half a Confession (2004)
 Year One in the North (2005)
 Katenkoru (2005)
 Hotori no Sakuko (2013)
 The Ravine of Goodbye (2013)
 Destiny: The Tale of Kamakura (2017)
 Umi wo Kakeru (2018)
 Katsu Fūtarō!! (2019)
 Noise (2022)
 One Day, You Will Reach the Sea (2022)

Television
 Ranman (2023), Ōhata Ichi

Dubbing
 Charlotte's Web (Charlotte)

External links
 tsurutamayu.com
 
 JMDb profile

References

People from Kamakura
Seijo University alumni
1970 births
Living people
Actresses from Kanagawa Prefecture